Rajan Pallan is an Indian National Congress politician from Thrissur city, India. He was the fifth mayor of Thrissur Municipal Corporation.

References

1965 births
Living people
Mayors of Thrissur
Indian National Congress politicians from Kerala